Aleksei Mikhailovich Gritsai (7 March 1914 – 6 May 1998) was a Soviet and Russian artist. From 1924 to 1931 he studied in Leningrad in the studios of S.M. Zaidenberg and from 1932 to 1939 at the Academy of Arts under P. S. Naumov, Vasily Yakovlev, and Isaak Brodsky.

Gritsai became best known as a landscape painter with a deep appreciation for the power of nature to provide inspiration for humanity. He believed that since humans are a part of nature they can find joy and consolation through positive interaction with it. Due to the reduced mobility brought by sickness at the end of his life, he was unable to work directly in nature and had to rely on his memory. Because of this, much of his final work is imbued with the poignancy of reminiscence.

Gritsai was a People's Artist of the USSR (1974), an academician of the USSR Academy of Arts (1964), the laureate of two Stalin Prizes (1951 and 1952) and one USSR State Prize (1978).

External links
Online Gallery of Gritsay's works 
Gallery of Gritsai Works

1914 births
1998 deaths
20th-century Russian painters
Full Members of the Russian Academy of Arts
Full Members of the USSR Academy of Arts
Repin Institute of Arts alumni
People's Artists of the USSR (visual arts)
Stalin Prize winners
Recipients of the Medal "For Courage" (Russia)
Recipients of the Order of Friendship of Peoples
Recipients of the Order of the Red Banner of Labour
Recipients of the USSR State Prize
Russian landscape painters
Russian male painters
Russian portrait painters
Soviet painters

Burials at Vagankovo Cemetery